The geography of Minot, North Dakota is treated extensively in this article.

Physical geography

It is almost entirely land; the Souris River, its numerous surrounding oxbow lakes, and a few creeks take up just 0.14% of the city's total landmass.

The city is located along the Souris River (also known as the Mouse River), some 30 km from its southernmost point near Velva. It eventually turns northwest and meets with the Assiniboine River, which eventually flows into Hudson Bay.

Relative to other locations
Outside Minot, the closest cities are Burlington to the west, and Surrey to the east. The unincorporated community of Ruthville lies between Minot and Minot AFB to the north. To the southeast along US 52, there is the unincorporated community of Logan. The nearest community to the south of Minot is Max, over 40 km distant. The near-desolate towns of Drady and Saron are also near Minot.

Important cities in the region for which Minot is the trading center include Bottineau, Garrison, New Town, Rugby, Stanley, and Velva.

Cities in the "Greater Minot" area, including unincorporated(~) cities
Minot AFB (5,521) + Ruthville (191)
Burlington (1,102) + Brookside 
Surrey (972)
~Gassman ("Trestle Valley") 
~Logan (194)
~South Prairie 
~Drady 
~Saron

Local grid and address system
The city is laid out on a grid-based street system. Streets run north–south and avenues run east–west. Streets are numbered by their block distance east or west of Main Street. Similarly, Avenues are numbered north and south of Central Avenue. Addresses south of Central Avenue are designated south, while addresses north of Central are designated north. Similarly, addresses east of Main Street are designated east, while addresses west of Main are designated west. There are four city quadrants (NW, SW, SE, NE) to describe the exact location of any given address. Main Street addresses are simply designated North and South. Central Avenue addresses are simply designated East and West.

Major streets
North-South:
16th Street West
6th and 8th Streets West
Broadway (US 83)
3rd Street East
Valley Street (Bus. US 52)
Hiawatha Street

East-West:
21st Avenue North
University Avenue
4th, 3rd, 5th, Railway Avenue
The Quentin N. Burdick Expressway (Bus. US 2/52)
11th Avenue South
20th Avenue South
32nd Avenue South

Major divisions
The Souris River, also known as the "Mouse River", divides the city approximately in half, north and south. The valley rises to the plains both north and south of the river. Minot does not have particular names for these general topographic divisions of the city. The Valley is simply the Valley (or not called anything at all). The northern rise and the plateau north of it are referred to as North Hill and the southern rise and plateau south of it are referred to as South Hill.

Commercial areas
Minot has several commercial areas, the first of which is Broadway (US Highway 83) itself, the main north–south trunk route.

Downtown Minot - generally refers to the area bounded by Broadway, 3rd Street East, Central Avenue, and Burdick Expressway, though the immediate vicinity is often also included.

Southwest Minot - There is a major shopping district along 16th Street SW south of the 2/52/83 bypass, including Dakota Square Mall, Wal-Mart, and various other shops.

The Arrowhead Mall is located at Central Avenue and 16th Street West. Oak Park Center is nearby, along 4th Avenue NW. There is also Town and Country Center, located at Broadway and 11th Avenue SW.

Neighborhoods
More specific named divisions tend to be upscale residential areas. These include Bel Air, which is the area north of 4th Avenue NW and west of 16th Street NW and includes Bel-Air Elementary School, Eastwood Park, which is southwest of Roosevelt Park and north of Burdick Expressway along 7th and 8th Streets SE, Terracita Vallejo which is actually outside of the city, west of the US 83 bypass but north of US 2/52, and Green Acres, which is off 16th St. SW near Dakota Square mall and other area shopping with a neighborhood park. Southwest Knolls is one of the more established wealthy neighborhoods of Minot, specifically 8th, 9th, and 10th Streets South, along South Hill.

References

Minot, North Dakota
Geography of Ward County, North Dakota